U. orientalis  may refer to:
 Udotea orientalis, an alga species in the genus Udotea
 Uperoleia orientalis, the Alexandria toadlet, a frog species endemic to Australia

See also
 Orientalis (disambiguation)